Zhang Heng is a fictional character in Water Margin, one of the Four Great Classical Novels in Chinese literature. Nicknamed "Boatman", he ranks 28th among the 36 Heavenly Spirits, the first third of the 108 Stars of Destiny.

Background
The novel depicts Zhang Heng as seven chi tall and having triangle-shaped crimson eyes, yellow whiskers and red hair. He is an excellent swimmer who can survive under water in all weathers. Nicknamed "Boatman" , he preys on travellers who take his boat thinking he is just a simple ferryman.

Zhang Heng and his younger brother Zhang Shun live at Jieyang Ridge (揭陽嶺; believed to be in present-day Jiujiang, Jiangxi) near the Xunyang River. They use a trick to rob their boat passengers without taking lives. Zhang Shun would disguise himself as a passenger whom Zhang Heng would throw overboard when he pretends to defend his valuables. Zhang Shun would make it to shore while the other travellers are so frightened that they surrender all they have. Zhang Shun later moves to Jiangzhou alone (江州; present-day Jiujiang, Jiangxi) where he becomes a fishmonger. Without his brother's collusion, Zhang Heng simply kills his passengers by knifing or drowning them.

Meeting Song Jiang
When Song Jiang is exiled to Jiangzhou (江州; present-day Jiujiang, Jiangxi) as a mitigated sentence for killing his mistress Yan Poxi, he passes by Jieyang Town where he offends the Mu brothers (Mu Hong and Mu Chun) by giving money to street performer Xue Yong, who has neglected to pay respect to the Mus. After unknowingly finding accommodation at the house of the Mus thanks to the kindness of the brothers' father, Song and his two escorts have to sneak away when they realise they are close to danger. Pursued by the Mus, the three scramble on to the boat of Zhang Heng when they come to the bank of Xunyang River. Halfway across the waters, Zhang Heng draws out his knife and asks them whether they would rather be knifed or drowned. Just when the three are resigned to jumping into the river, Li Jun, whom Song Jiang has come to know only recently at Jieyang Ridge, passes by in his boat. Zhang Heng is shocked to learn that the exile is Song Jiang, who is well-known for chivalry. He apologises to him. The Mu brothers, who linger at the bank, are also sorry for the distress they caused him.  They treat Song as an honoured guest before seeing him off to Jiangzhou.

Joining Liangshan
Song Jiang is arrested and sentenced to death for composing a seditious poem, which he wrote on the wall of a restaurant after getting drunk. The outlaws from Liangshan Marsh hurry to Jiangzhou, storm the execution ground and rescue him and the chief warden Dai Zong, who is implicated for trying to rescue Song. After fleeing Jiangzhou, the group is stranded at a riverbank. Luckily, Zhang Heng and other friends of Song Jiang from the Jieyang region arrive in boats on their way to rescue him. Zhang Heng follows the band to Liangshan.

When Guan Sheng, by order of the Song court,  leads an imperial force to stamp out Liangshan, Zhang Heng, who wants to score merit for himself, leads some men to raid his camp without informing other chieftains except Ruan Xiaoqi. He falls into Guan's trap and is captured. He is freed after Guan surrenders and joins Liangshan.

Campaigns and death
Zhang Heng is appointed as one of the commanders of Liangshan‘s flotilla after the 108 Stars of Destiny came together in what is called the Grand Assembly. Zhang Heng participates in the campaigns against the Liao invaders and rebel forces on Song territory following amnesty from Emperor Huizong for Liangshan.

In the battle of Hangzhou in the campaign against Fang La, Zhang Shun tries to sneak into the city by climbing over the sluice gate of Yongjin. But he is killed by a hail of arrows when Fang Tianding, the son of Fang La, spots him. Zhang Shun's spirit possesses Zhang Heng's body and seeks out Fang Tianding whom he kills using the hand of his brother. Zhang Heng falls unconscious after the revenge. When he comes to, he is sad to learn of his brother's death that he falls sick and dies soon after.

References
 
 
 
 
 
 
 

36 Heavenly Spirits
Fictional pirates
Fictional characters from Jiangxi